Yumna Zaidi (born 30 July 1989), is a Pakistani television actress. She has established her career as one of the leading television actress in Urdu-television industry and is known for portraying diverse characters in social to romantic dramas. Zaidi is the recipient of three Lux Style Awards.

Zaidi first appeared as a supporting character in ARY Digital domestic-drama Thakan (2012) and then played lead roles in several television series, including the melodrama Khushi Ek Roag, the romantic drama Teri Raah Main Rul Gai, (both 2012) the family drama Meri Dulari and the revenge drama Ullu Baraye Farokht Nahi (both 2013), the later of which earned her praise and a nomination of Hum Award for Best Supporting Actress. She gained popularity and Hum Award for Best Actress and Best Actress Popular nominations by portraying a troubled wife in Farooq Rind's tragic-romance Rishtay Kuch Adhooray Se (2014), and continued to receive praise for portraying diverse characters in jealous-drama Mausam (2014), the comedy drama Jugnoo (2015) (both earned three Hum Awards nominations), the tragic-romance Guzaarish (2015), the romance Zara Yaad Kar (2016), the dark revenge Pinjra and the romantic comedy Yeh Raha Dil (both 2017), the later of which earned him a further nomination. 

Zaidi then gained critical successes and established herself by starring in Dar Si Jaati Hai Sila (2017), Inkaar (2019), Pyar Ke Sadqay (2020) and Dil Na Umeed To Nahi (2021), the second and third of these earned her Lux Style Award for Best Television Actress.

Early life and family
Zaidi, born and raised in Lahore, resides in Texas and works in between Karachi-Lahore. Her Father Zameendar Zaidi was a business man who died in June 2019, and mother Shabana Naheed Zaidi is a house wife. She is From a village Arif Wala in Pakpattan, Punjab. She has done a masters in interior designing and has some experience in Radio Jockey and hosting.

Career
She did not aspire to pursue a career in acting, however, on the insistence of her friend Affan Waheed, she dabbled with acting by playing a supporting role in the ARY Digital's 2012 domestic drama Thakan, and followed it with a leading role in the melodrama Khushi Ek Roag. She then appeared in Urdu 1's Teri Raah Main Rul Gai opposite Samiya Mumtaz and Sami Khan where she played the character of Maryam.

Zaidi received praise for portraying emotionally intense characters in the dramas, Geo TV's Meri Dulari (2013) and Hum TV's Ullu Baraye Farokht Nahi (2013), the later of which garnered her a Best Supporting Actress nomination at Hum Awards. Her acclaimed role of a troubled wife in the tragic romance Rishtay Kuch Adhooray Se (2013), established her as a leading actress of Pakistan and earned her the Hum Award for Best Actress and Best Actress Popular nominations. Zaidi subsequently did a special appearance in 2013 series Sannata and played supporting role in Kashif Nisar's directorial Kis Se Kahoon alongside Sajal Ali and Agha Ali. She gained wider recognition for portraying a range of characters in the dramas Mausam (2014), Madawa (2015), Guzaarish (2015), and Jugnoo (2015), Kaanch Ki Guriya (2015), Paras (2015) and Aap ki Kaneez (2015), some of which garnered her several Best Actress nominations.

In 2016 she appeared in Momina Duraid's Zara Yaad Kar where she played the lead character of Uzma Ikhtiar opposite Zahid Ahmed and Sana Javed.

She then appeared in Hum TV's Yeh Raha Dil in 2017 opposite Ahmed Ali. Zaidi played the character of Hayat whose mother has died and father deserted her at a young age. Her on-screen chemistry with Ali was praised by viewers and earned her nomination of Best on-screen couple at Hum Awards. Later she signed Kashif Nisar's directorial Pinjra. In the same year she appeared as Sila, a victim of sexual harassment in Bee Gul's directed Dar Si Jaati Hai Sila opposite Noman Ijaz and Saman Ansari. A critic from The News International praised her saying, "With fewer dialogues and a tough subject at hand, Yumna pulled off her role effortlessly, making it believable from beginning till the end".

As of 2018–2019, she appeared in Pukaar as Samra, widow of the feudal lord and appeared in 7th Sky Entertainment's Project Dil Kiya Karey, directed by Mehreen Jabbar. She played a role of Hajra in social drama Inkaar opposite Imran Ashraf and Sami Khan and made special appearance in Angeline Malik's anthology series Choti Choti Batain. She further appeared in an extended cameo in Ishq Zahe Naseeb and as Raina in telefilm Shaadi Impossible.

Other work
Zaidi is widely active in media and appeared in talkshows often. In 2016 after the banned on crime drama series Udaari, she raised her voice saying "It is based on a social cause and we should create awareness in our society through such drama serials". She walked the ramp for designer Aisha Farid's collection Crystalline on Hum TV's Bridal Couture Week. She also appeared in celebrity comedy talkshow Mazaaq Raat in 2017.

Filmography

Television

Telefilms

Other appearances

Awards and nominations

References

External links 
 

Living people
Pakistani female models
Pakistani television actresses
1989 births
Actresses from Karachi
21st-century Pakistani actresses
Pakistani emigrants to the United States